The Central African Republican Party (PRC) is a political party in the Central African Republic.

History
The party was founded by Jeanne-Marie Ruth-Rolland in 1991 after she was released from prison. She won a seat in the National Assembly in the 1992 general elections, but the results were later annulled. In the 1993 general elections Ruth-Rolland stood as the party's presidential candidate, finishing last in a field of eight with 1% of the vote. The party won a single seat in the National Assembly, with Ruth-Rolland winning a seat in Bakouma.

Ruth-Rolland led the party until her death in 1995, and was succeeded by Jacques Ngoli. The party failed to win a seat in the 1998 parliamentary elections, and did not contest the 1999 presidential elections. The party also failed to win a seat in the 2005 general elections.

In 2010 the party joined the Presidential Majority alliance in preparation for the 2011 general elections. The PRC nominated a single candidate for the 105 seats in the National Assembly, and although the alliance won 11 seats, the PRC again failed to win a seat.

References

1991 establishments in the Central African Republic
Conservative liberal parties
Political parties established in 1991
Political parties in the Central African Republic
Republican parties